Wind power in Virginia is in the early stages of development. In March 2015, Virginia became the first state in the United States to receive a wind energy research lease to build and operate offshore wind turbines in federal waters. As of 2019, Virginia had no utility scale wind farms.

The Virginia Clean Economy Act of 2020 directs the construction of 16,100 MW of solar power and onshore wind and up to 5,200 MW of offshore wind by 2035, bringing the state's utility-delivered power to 100% renewable energy by 2045.

Wind Development Authority
The Virginia Offshore Wind Development Authority was created by 2010 legislation to facilitate, coordinate, and support development of the offshore wind energy industry, offshore wind energy projects, and supply chain vendors and to  ways to encourage and expedite offshore wind industry development. It attempts to collect metocean and environmental data, identify regulatory and administrative barriers, work with government agencies to upgrade port and logistic facilities and sites, and ensure development is compatible with other ocean uses and avian/marine wildlife.

Wind for Schools
Sponsored by the Department of Energy, the Wind for Schools program has installed small scale wind turbines for educational use at schools throughout state to encourages the incorporation of renewable energy education into the K-12 science curriculum through the Virginia Center for Wind at James Madison University and built by Baker Renewable Energy. The first went up at Northumberland Middle and High School at Heathsville. Other locations include Luray High School and Chesapeake High School. In 2012 turbines were installed at Central High School in Woodstock and Thomas Harrison Middle School in Harrisonburg.

Rocky Forge Wind
Rocky Forge Wind was announced in 2015 and originally planned scheduled to be operational by 2017; delays have set back the projected opening.

Coastal Virginia Offshore Wind (CVOW)
The Virginia Offshore Wind Technology Advancement Project (VOWTAP) is a program to establish offshore wind farms in the Atlantic Ocean off the coast of Virginia. In May 2014, Dominion Virginia Power was awarded $47 million from the United States Department of Energy (DOE) to help fund the construction of a 12-megawatt demonstration project, consisting of two 6-megawatt offshore wind turbines. It intended to have them in full operation in 2017, but postponed the project since the single bid for construction was too high. Some exploratory boring off the coast has taken place. It was later renamed Coastal Virginia Offshore Wind.

See also

Solar power in Virginia
Wind power in the United States
List of offshore wind farms in the United States
Block Island Wind Farm
Cape Wind
Fisherman's Energy
Atlantic Wind Connection

References